Ptyodactylus ananjevae is a species of gecko in the family Phyllodactylidae. The species is endemic to Jordan.

Etymology
The specific name, ananjevae, is in honor of Russian herpetologist Natalia Ananjeva.

Geographic range
P. ananjevae is found in southern Jordan.

Description

References

Further reading
Nazarov, Roman; Melnikov, Daniel; Melnikova, Ekaterina (2013). "Three New Species of Ptyodactylus (Reptilia; Squamata; Phyllodactylidae) from the Middle East". Russian Journal of Herpetology 20 (2): 147–162. (Ptyodactylus ananjevae, new species).

Ptyodactylus
Reptiles of Jordan
Reptiles described in 2013